Dana is a unisex given name. It was among the 100 most popular names given to girls born in the United States between 1960 and 1990. It has since fallen in popularity and was ranked the 446th most popular name given to girls born in the United States in 2007. As a male forename it is well known in the United States, being in the 314th rank out of 1,219 in the 1990 U.S. Census.

The name has multiple derivations. Dana or Danah, in Arabic, means "the most perfectly sized, valuable and beautiful pearl". This name is used mainly by Arab states of the Persian Gulf (Eastern Arabia), due to their traditional pearl diving professions wherein they gave different type of pearls names. In Persian, the word Dānā literally means "Wise", and some speculate that the name is first used as a first name in Shahnameh. It may also refer to the mountain Dana or Dena. The name is used in Persian for both female and male sexes. It may also come from "Dane" (from Denmark), the meaning of the common surname. It is also occasionally regarded as a feminine version of Daniel or a short version of feminine names such as Bogdana or Yordana.  In Hebrew, the name Dana means "arbiter" or "God is my judge". In Sanskrit and Pali, the word means "generosity". In Romanian and Czech, it is a feminine name, derived from the name Daniela; the masculine form being Dan/Daniel.

People named Dana

Female
Dana Al-Nasrallah (born 1988), Kuwaiti Olympic sprinter
Dana Anderson (born 1973), Canadian former field hockey player
Dana Angluin, professor of computer science at Yale University
Dana Antal (born 1977), Canadian ice hockey player, gold medalist at the 2002 Winter Olympics
Dana Beth Ardi, American entrepreneur, human capitalist, author, and contemporary art collector
Dana Barron (born 1966), American actress
Dana Bash (born 1971), CNN News reporter and anchorwoman
Dana Belben, American voice actress, animator, screenwriter, effects artist, and comedian
Dana Berger (born 1970), Israeli singer-songwriter and occasional actress
Dana Berliner, American lawyer, litigation director at the Institute for Justice
Dana H. Born (born 1961), brigadier general in the United States Air Force
Dana Bradley (died 1981), Canadian murder victim
Dana Broccoli, actress and novelist, wife of producer Albert R. Broccoli, mother of producer Michael G. Wilson
Dana Brožková (born 1981), Czech orienteering competitor
Dana Buchman, fashion designer
Dana Cameron (born 1965), American archaeologist, and author of award-winning crime fiction and urban fantasy
Dana Cervantes (born 1978), Spanish Olympic pole vaulter
Dana "Pokey" Chatman (born 1969), general manager and head coach of the Chicago Sky of the WNBA
Dana Chladek (born 1963), Czechoslovak-born American Olympic slalom kayaker and coach
Dana Claxton (born 1959), Hunkpapa Lakota filmmaker, photographer and performance artist
Dana Coons (born 1978), American long distance runner
Dana Cowin, magazine editor (Food & Wine, Mademoiselle, HG)
Dana Cuff, American architect, professor, and founding director of UCLA's cityLAB
Dana Davis (born 1978), American actress, known for 10 Things I Hate About You and Franklin & Bash
Dana Dawson (1974-2010), American actress and singer
Dana DeArmond (born 1979), American pornographic actress
Dana Delany (born 1956), American film, stage, and television actress
Dana Dodd (1985-2006), American woman who was murdered
Dana Dogaru (born 1953), Romanian actress
Dana Dormann (born 1967), American professional golfer, also played as Dana Lofland
Dana Ellis (born 1979), Canadian pole vaulter
Dana Eskelson (born 1965), American television, film, and theater actress
Dana Fabe (born 1951), lawyer, Chief Justice of Alaska Supreme Court
Dana Faletic (born 1977), Australian Olympic rower
Dana Fecková (born 1987), Slovak football striker
Dana Ferguson (born 1987), Canadian curler
Dana Fischer (born 2010), American Magic: The Gathering player
Dana Flynn (born 1975), also known as Didem Erol, Australian-born Turkish-American actress, model, and TV host
Dana Fox (born 1976), American screenwriter
Dana Frankfort (born 1971), New York-based artist, painting professor at Boston University College of Fine Arts
Dana Fuchs (born 1976), American singer, songwriter, actress, and voice actress
Dana Gibson, president of Sam Houston State University
Dana Gilbert (born 1959), American tennis player
Dana Gillespie (born 1949), English actress and singer
Dana E. Glauberman (born 1968), American film editor
Dana Glover (singer) (born 1974), American pop singer and songwriter
Dana Goldstein, American journalist and editor
Dana Goodyear (born 1976), American journalist, poet and author, co-founder of Figment online community
Dana Guth (born 1970), German politician
Dana Sue Gray (born 1957), American serial killer
Dana Hadačová (born 1983), Czech Olympic table tennis player
Dana Haidar (born 1993), Jordanian taekwondo competitor
Dana Hee (born 1961), American Olympic taekwondo competitor, motivational speaker and stuntwoman
Dana Hill (1964-1996), American actress and voice actor
Dana Hoey (born 1966), American photographer
Dana Humby (born 1979), former New Zealand association football player
Dana Hussain (born 1986), sprinter on Iraq's national track and field team
Dana International (born 1969), Israeli singer (stage name of Sharon Cohen), winner of the 1998 Eurovision Song Contest
Dana Ivey (born 1941), American character actress
Dana Ivgy (born 1982), Israeli actress
Dana Jacobson (born 1971), American sports journalist and former ESPN anchor
Dana Jurásková (born 1961), Czech politician, former Minister of Health
Dana Kerem (born 1986), Israeli football defender
Dana Kimmell (born 1959), American actress
Dana King (born 1960), former American TV news anchor
Dana Kirk (born 1984), American Olympic swimmer
Dana Kletter (born 1959), American musician and writer
Dana Kuchtová (born 1961), Czech Green politician, former Minister of Education
Dana Levin (born 1965), American poet and creative writing instructor
Dana Lixenberg (born 1964), Dutch photographer
Dana Loesch, American conservative TV and radio host
Dana Mann, American slalom canoer, formerly competed for Slovakia as Dana Beňušová
Dana Marie, Canadian Christian rock singer
Dana Martanová, former Czechoslovak slalom canoer
Dana Marton, romantic suspense novelist
Dana Mathis, American pop singer and songwriter
Dana McCauley, Canadian chef and food writer
Dana McVicker, American country music singer
Donella H. "Dana" Meadows, American environmental scientist, teacher and writer
Dana Medřická, Czechoslovak film actress
Dana Murphy, American Republican politician from Oklahoma
Dana Nălbaru, Romanian singer, songwriter, and musician, member of Hi-Q
Dana D. Nelson, professor of English at Vanderbilt University, progressive advocate for citizenship and democracy
 Dana Nutu, Romanian-Australian chess player and trainer, also known as Daniela Nuțu-Gajić
Dana Oldfather, American oil painter and dinnerware designer
Dana Olmert, Israeli left-wing activist, literary theorist and editor, daughter of Ehud Olmert
 Dana Owens, also known as Queen Latifah, American rapper, singer and actress
Dana Perino, former White House press secretary
Dana Plato, American actress
Dana Plotogea, Romanian Olympic biathlete
Dana Priest, journalist and author, national security correspondent for the Washington Post
Dana Procházková, Czechoslovak orienteering competitor
Dana Protopopescu, Romanian-Belgian pianist and music instructor
Dana Pyritz, German Olympic rower
Dana Randall, professor of theoretical computer science at Georgia Tech
Dana Ranga, Romanian writer and film director
Dana Rayne, American dance and pop singer
Dana Reason, Canadian pianist and composer
Dana Reeve, American actress, wife of Christopher Reeve, also billed as Dana Morosini
Dana Reizniece-Ozola, Latvian politician and chess player
Dana Rettke (born 1999), American volleyball player
Dana Ron, Israeli computer scientist, professor of electrical engineering
Dana Rosendorff, Australian actress
Dana Rosemary Scallon, Irish singer and politician, winner of the 1970 Eurovision Song Contest, former MEP
 Dana Schechter, singer-songwriter with the band Bee and Flower
Dana Schoenfield, American Olympic swimmer
Dana Schutz, American painter
Dana Seetahal, Trinidadian politician and attorney
Dana Shrader, American Olympic swimmer
Dana Simpson, American cartoonist (Heavenly Nostrils, Ozy and Millie)
Dana Spálenská, Czechoslovak Olympic luger
Dana Spiotta, American novelist
Dana Stabenow, Alaskan author
Dana Stephensen, Australian ballerina
Dana Stevens (critic), movie critic at Slate magazine
Dana Stevens (screenwriter), American screenwriter and TV producer
Dana Suesse, American musician, composer and lyricist
Dana Swanson, American singer, actress and writer
Dana Syslová, Czech actress
Dana Telsey, American equity research analyst
Dana Terrace (born 1990), American cartoonist
Dana Thomas, American fashion and culture journalist
Dana Tyler, American local TV news anchor
Dana Ulery, American computer scientist
Dana Valery (born 1944), Italian-born singer and actress
Dana van Dreven (born 1974), also known as DJ Lady Dana, Dutch DJ
Dana Vavřačová (born 1954), retired Czech competitive race walker
Dana Vávrová (1967-2009), Czech-German film actress and director
Dana Velďáková (born 1981), Slovak Olympic triple jumper
Dana Vespoli, American pornographic actress and director
Dana Vollmer (born 1987), American swimmer
Dana Weigel, NASA flight director
Dana Wheeler-Nicholson (born 1960), American actress
Dana Winner (born 1965), Belgian singer
Dana Wolfe, American journalist and TV producer
Dana Wortley (born 1959), Australian politician
Dana Wright (born 1959), Canadian former hurdler
Dana Wynter (born Dagmar Winter), actress
Dana Wyse (born 1965), Canadian writer and visual artist
Dana Young (born 1964), American politician
Dana Zátopková (1922-2020), Czech javelin thrower, Olympic gold medal winner, wife of runner Emil Zátopek
Princess Dana Al Khalifa of Bahrain, Bahraini lawyer and fashion blogger

Male
Dana Allison (born 1966), American former professional baseball player
Dana Altman (born 1958), Oregon University basketball coach
Dana Andersen, Canadian actor, improvisor, filmmaker, writer and director
Dana Andrews (1909-1992), American actor
Dana Ashbrook (born 1967), American actor
Dana Reed Bailey (1833-1908), American politician and lawyer
Dana H. Ballard (born 1946), American professor of computer science
Dana Barros (born 1967), American former professional basketball player, owner of the Dana Barros Sports Complex
Dana W. Bartlett (1860-1942), American Congregationalist minister
Dana Beal (born 1947), American social and political activist
Dana Bible (born 1953), American football coach and former player
Dana X. Bible (1891-1980), American football player, coach, and athletic administrator
Dana Boente (born 1954), Acting Attorney General of the United States
Dana Bourgeois (born 1953), American luthier
Dana Brinson (born 1965), former professional American football wide receiver
Dana Brown (born 1959), American surfer and film-maker, son of Bruce Brown
Dana Brunetti, American film producer and social networking entrepreneur
Dana Bullen (born 1973), director of the Press Freedom Committee, former foreign editor of The Washington Star
Dana Bumgardner (born 1954), American politician
Dana Tai Soon Burgess (born 1968), American performance artist and choreographer
Dana Carvey (born 1955), American comedian who has appeared as a cast member of Saturday Night Live and in the Wayne's World movie series
Dana Chambers (1895-1946), pen name of the mystery novelist Albert Leffingwell
Dana Childs (1922-1999), Member of the Maine House of Representatives
Dana K. Chipman (born 1958), American military lawyer, former Judge Advocate General of the United States Army
Dana L. Christensen (born 1951), American federal judge, for the District of Montana
Dana Colley (born 1961), American musician, saxophonist in the alternative rock band Morphine
Dana Countryman (born 1954), American electronic music composer and performer, publisher of Cool and Strange Music Magazine
Dana Dane (born 1965 as Dana McLeese), rap artist
Dana DeMuth (born 1956), Major League Baseball umpire
Dana Deshler (1937-2012), member of the Ohio House of Representatives
Dana Dimel (born 1962), American football coach and former player
Dana A. Dorsey (1872-1940), American businessman, banker, and philanthropist
Dana Dow, Republican former Maine state senator
Dana Elcar (1927-2005), American television and movie character actor
Dana Evans (athletic director) (1874-1924), American athlete, coach and athletics administrator
Dana Eveland (born 1983), American professional baseball pitcher
Dana Ewell (born 1971), American convicted triple murderer
Dana Fillingim (1893-1961), American major league baseball pitcher
Dana Gioia (born 1950), American poet
Dana Karl Glover (born 1958), American trumpet player and music composer for video games, also known as Karl James or Dr. Dana
Dana Goldman, professor of economics at the University of Southern California
Dana Gonzales, American cinematographer
Dana Gould, American comedian and comedy writer
Dana McLean Greeley, founding president of the Unitarian Universalist Association
Dana Hall, former American professional football player
Dana Hall (musician), American jazz drummer, percussionist, composer, bandleader, and ethnomusicologist
Dana Hamilton, American hammered dulcimer player
Dana Hammond, American record producer, composer, songwriter, drummer and bass guitarist
Dana Heitman, trumpeter for the Cherry Poppin' Daddies
Dana Holgorsen, American football coach and former player
Dana Howard (American football), former professional American football player
Dana Jennings, American journalist and author, New York Times editor
Dana Jones (basketball), former American professional basketball player
Dana Kafer, American college football player
Dana Evan Kaplan, rabbi, writer on Reform Judaism and American Judaism
Dana Key, American Christian rock singer and pastor
Dana Kiecker, former major league baseball pitcher, sportscaster
Dana M. King, American college football coach
Dana Kirk (basketball), American college basketball coach
Dana Knutson, American fantasy artist, known for illustrating role-playing games
Dana Kunze, former champion high diver
Dana Lamb, American travel writer, co-wrote with his wife Ginger
Dana Lambert, Canadian author, politician and cannabis legalization activist
Dana LeVangie, American professional baseball player, scout and coach
Dana Lewis, Canadian TV journalist
Dana Lyons, folk music and alternative rock musician
Dana Ahmed Majid, Iraqi Kurdish politician, former governor of Sulaymaniah
Dana Malone, American politician, attorney general of Massachusetts
Dana McLemore, former professional American football cornerback
Dana G. Mead, American businessman, former chairman of MIT's board of trustees
Dana Milbank, American journalist
Dana Mohler-Faria, American education administrator, president of Bridgewater State University
Dana Morgan, Jr., bassist for the Warlocks
Dana Carleton Munro, American historian
Dana Murzyn, former Canadian professional ice hockey league player
Dana S. Nau, professor of computer science and systems research at the University of Maryland, College Park
Dana Nafziger, American football player
Dana Nielsen, American mix engineer, audio engineer, record producer and saxophonist
Dana Olsen, American scriptwriter
Dana Pagett, American professional basketball player and coach
Dana Peterson, American political consultant, husband of Louisiana state senator Karen Carter Peterson
Dana J. H. Pittard, American major general
Dana Porter, Canadian politician and jurist
Dana Quigley, American professional golfer
Dana Redd, American Democratic politician, mayor of Camden, New Jersey
Dana G. "Buck" Rinehart, 50th mayor of Columbus, Ohio
Dana Rohrabacher, U.S. Representative (R-CA)
"Dangerous" Dana Rosenblatt, American world champion middleweight boxer
Dana Fuller Ross, pen name used by Western novelists Noel B. Gerson and James M. Reasoner
Dana P. Rowe, American musical theater composer
Dana Rucker, American college football coach
Dana Makoto Sabraw, United States federal judge
Dana Sawyer, American biographer and professor of religion
Dana Scott, American mathematician
Dana Adam Shapiro, American film director
Dana Sheridan, American flute maker
Dana Shires, American physician, research scientist, and inventor
Dana A. Simmons, American air force general
Dana Snyder, American comedian and actor
Dana Snyman, South African journalist, writer and playwright
Dana Stein, American Democratic politician
Dana Stinson, American hip hop and R&B record producer, rapper and singer, known by the stage name Rockwilder
Dana Stone, American photo-journalist
Dana Strum (born 1958), heavy metal bassist (Slaughter)
Dana Stubblefield (born 1970), American professional football defensive tackle
Dana Summers, American cartoonist (Bound and Gagged, The Middletons)
Dana Tomlin, American cartographer, inventor of map algebra
Dana Tyrell (born 1989), American professional ice hockey player
Dana Veth (born 1987), former Bahamian footballer
Dana Wachs, American lawyer and politician
Dana Ward (born 1957), professor emeritus of political studies at Pitzer College
Dana Wells (born 1966), retired American football nose tackle
Dana White (born 1969), President of the UFC (Ultimate Fighting Championship)
L. Dana Wilgress (1892-1969), Canadian diplomat
Dana Williams (baseball) (born 1963), retired American professional baseball player
Dana Wilson (born 1946), American composer, jazz pianist, and teacher
Dana Wilson (1983-2011), Cook Islands professional rugby league player
Dana Zimmerman, American paralympic athlete

Fiction
 Dana, fictional intern on the podcast Welcome to Night Vale
Dana, on the television show Angel
 Dana, the title character's lover in the Italian photo comic Killing (later revived as Sadistik: The Diabolikal Super-Kriminal)
Dana Appleton, the lawyer opposite Jim Carrey's character in the 1997 film Liar Liar
Dana Barrett, featured in the Ghostbusters movies
Dana Carrington, minor character in the American TV series Dynasty
Dana Cruz, character on Zoey 101
Dana Dearden, obsessed Superman fan who called herself Superwoman
Dana Fairbanks, main character from Showtime's lesbian drama series The L Word
Dana Foster, fictional character on Step By Step
Dana Freeling, a female character in the film Poltergeist (1982)
Dana Iclucia female protagonist from the video game Ys VIII: Lacrimosa of Dana
Dana Knightstone, fictional novelist, main character of the Dana Knightstone series of games
Dana Lambert, regular character on the TV show Mission: Impossible
Dana Marschz, main character in Hamlet 2
Dana Mercer, younger sister of main character Alex Mercer in the video game Prototype
Dana Mitchell, on the show Lightspeed Rescue Power Rangers
Dana Monroe, from EastEnders
Dana Scully, one of the main characters on the television show The X-Files
Dana Sterling, from the Robotech anime television series
Dana Stevens, a fictional trans woman featured in Chris Bohjalian's novel Trans-Sister Radio
Dana Tan, Batman's girlfriend on the TV series Batman Beyond
 Dana Taylor, the former name of Zach Young on the television show Desperate Housewives
Dana Whitaker, a character in the television series Sports Night
Dana Wolf, on the German soap opera Verbotene Liebe

Mythology
Danu (Irish goddess), mother goddess of the Tuatha Dé Danann, known as Dana in modern Irish

See also
Dana (disambiguation)
Dannah
Danaë
Dayna
Danna

References

Feminine given names
Arabic masculine given names
Arabic feminine given names
Arabic unisex given names
English-language unisex given names
Unisex given names
Masculine given names
English unisex given names
English masculine given names
English-language feminine given names
English feminine given names
English-language masculine given names
Romanian masculine given names
Romanian feminine given names